Polventon House is a grade II listed private house overlooking Mother Ivey's Bay near Padstow in Cornwall, England.

It was built in the International Style on a clifftop in 1936 for R.H. Stein.

References

International Style (architecture)
Grade II listed buildings in Cornwall